Fábio Alexandre da Silva Nunes (born 24 July 1992) is a Portuguese professional footballer who plays as a left-back or left winger for Polish club Widzew Łódź.

Club career
Born in Portimão, Algarve, Nunes played youth football for four clubs, including local Portimonense S.C. from ages 9–13 and 14–18. On 17 January 2010, whilst still a junior, he made his professional debut, coming on as a second-half substitute in a 2–1 home win against G.D. Estoril Praia in the Segunda Liga. He spent the 2011–12 season on loan at Parma FC, but only appeared for the Primavera side.

In the 2012 summer transfer window, Nunes signed a three-year contract with Blackburn Rovers for an undisclosed fee. He made his debut in the Football League Championship on 22 August, starting in the 2–1 home victory over Hull City.

On 24 January 2014, after only eight competitive appearances, Nunes returned to Italy by joining Serie B team U.S. Latina Calcio on a free transfer. In July, he returned to his country and moved to C.F. Os Belenenses.

Nunes appeared in 17 Primeira Liga games in his debut campaign, having renewed his link in December 2014 until June 2017. His first goal in the Portuguese top division came on 9 May 2015, as he scored a last-minute equaliser in a 1–1 away draw against Académica de Coimbra.

In January 2017, following a very brief spell with C.D. Tondela, Nunes returned to the Estádio do Restelo. In the ensuing summer, the free agent agreed to a two-year deal at PAE Kerkyra of the Super League Greece.

Nunes returned to Portugal and its second tier on 17 July 2018, joining newly-promoted S.C. Farense. He scored twice from 23 matches in 2019–20 in a return to the top flight after an 18-year absence, subsequently penning a one-year extension.

On 28 July 2021, Nunes signed with Polish I liga club Widzew Łódź on a two-year contract.

International career
All categories comprised, Nunes won 27 caps for Portugal at youth level. His first match with the under-21s occurred on 15 October 2012, as he played the full 90 minutes in a 0–1 friendly home loss to Ukraine.

References

External links

1992 births
Living people
People from Portimão
Sportspeople from Faro District
Portuguese footballers
Association football defenders
Association football wingers
Primeira Liga players
Liga Portugal 2 players
Portimonense S.C. players
FC Porto players
C.F. Os Belenenses players
C.D. Tondela players
S.C. Farense players
English Football League players
Blackburn Rovers F.C. players
Serie B players
Parma Calcio 1913 players
Latina Calcio 1932 players
Super League Greece players
PAE Kerkyra players
Ekstraklasa players
I liga players
Widzew Łódź players
Portugal youth international footballers
Portugal under-21 international footballers
Portuguese expatriate footballers
Expatriate footballers in England
Expatriate footballers in Italy
Expatriate footballers in Greece
Expatriate footballers in Poland
Portuguese expatriate sportspeople in England
Portuguese expatriate sportspeople in Italy
Portuguese expatriate sportspeople in Greece
Portuguese expatriate sportspeople in Poland